The Beja people (Beja: Oobja) are an ethnic group native to the Eastern Desert, inhabiting a coastal area from southeastern Egypt through eastern Sudan and into northwestern Eritrea. They are descended from peoples who have inhabited the area since 4000 BC or earlier, although they were Arabized by Arabs who settled in the region. They are nomadic, and live primarily in the Eastern Desert. They number around 1,900,000 to 2,200,000 people. Most of the Beja speak Arabic, while some speak the Cushitic language of Beja and the Semitic language of Tigre. In Eritrea and southeastern Sudan, many members of the Beni-Amer grouping speak Tigre. Originally, the Beja did not speak Arabic, however the migration of the numerous Arab tribes of Juhaynah, Mudar, Rabi'a, and many more to the Beja areas contributed to the Arabization and Islamization of them, however the Arabs did not fully settle in the Beja areas as they looked for better climate in other areas. The Beja have partially mixed with Arabs through intermarriages over the centuries, and by the 15th century were absorbed into Islam. The process of Arabization led to the Beja adopting the Arabic language, Arab clothing, and Arab kinship organization.

While many secondary sources identify the Ababda as an Arabic-speaking Beja tribe due to their cultural links with the Bishari, this is a misconception: The Ababda do not consider themselves Beja, nor are they so considered by Beja people.

History

The Beja are traditionally Cushitic-speaking pastoral nomads native to northeast Africa, formerly referred to as Blemmyes. The geographer Abu Nasr Mutahhar al-Maqdisi wrote in the tenth century that the Beja were at that time Christians. Beja territories in the Eastern desert were conquered and vassalised by the Kingdom of Aksum in the third century. The historian Al-Yaqubi documented five Beja Kingdoms in the 9th century. Originally, the Beja did not speak Arabic, however the migration of the numerous Arab tribes of Juhaynah, Mudar, Rabi'a, and many more to the Beja areas contributed to the Arabization and Islamization of them, however the Arabs did not fully settle in the Beja areas as they looked for better climate in other areas. The Beja have partially mixed with Arabs through intermarriages over the centuries, and by the 15th century, the Beja were Islamized. The now-Islamic Beja participated in the further Muslim conquest of Sudan, expanding southward. The Hadendoa Beja by the 18th century dominated much of eastern Sudan. In the Mahdist War of the 1880s to 1890s, the Beja fought on both sides, the Hadendoa siding with the Mahdist troops, while the Bisharin and Amarar tribes sided with the British, and some Beni Amer - a subset of the Beja who live largely in modern Eritrea - sided with the Ethiopian Ras Alula in certain battles, such as Kufit.

The Beja Congress was formed in 1952 with the aim of pursuing regional autonomy from the government in Khartoum. Frustrated by the lack of progress, the Beja Congress joined the insurgent National Democratic Alliance in the 1990s. The Beja Congress effectively controlled a part of eastern Sudan centered on Garoura and Hamshkoraib. The Beja Congress sabotaged the oil pipeline to Port Sudan several times during 1999 and 2000. In 2003, they rejected the peace deal arranged between the Sudanese government and the Sudan People's Liberation Army, and allied with the rebel movement of the Darfur region, the Sudan Liberation Movement/Army, in January 2004. A peace agreement was signed with the government of Sudan in October 2006. In the general elections in April 2010, the Beja Congress did not win a single seat in the National Assembly in Khartoum. In anger over alleged election fraud and the slow implementation of the peace agreement, the Beja Congress in October 2011 withdrew from the agreement, and later announced an alliance with the Sudan Liberation Movement/Army.

Geography

The Beja people inhabit a general area between the Nile River and the Red Sea in Sudan, Eritrea and eastern Egypt known as the Eastern Desert. Most of them live in the Sudanese states of Red Sea around Port Sudan, River Nile, Al Qadarif and Kassala, as well as in Northern Red Sea, Gash-Barka, and Anseba Regions in Eritrea, and southeastern Egypt. There are smaller populations of other Beja ethnic groups further north into Egypt's Eastern Desert. Some Beja groups are nomadic. The Kharga Oasis in Egypt's Western Desert is home to a large number of Qamhat Bisharin who were displaced by the Aswan High Dam. Jebel Uweinat is revered by the Qamhat.

Names
The Beja have been named "Blemmyes" in Roman times, Bəga in Aksumite inscriptions in Ge'ez, and "Fuzzy-Wuzzy" by Rudyard Kipling. Kipling was specifically referring to the Hadendoa, who fought the British, supporting the Mahdi, the Sudanese leader of the war against Turkish-Egyptian rule, supported by the British Imperial administration.

Language

Many of the Beja speak Arabic, while some speak the Beja language, known as Bidhaawyeet or Tubdhaawi in that language. It belongs to the Cushitic branch of the Afroasiatic family. Cohen noted that the Beja language is the Cushitic language with the largest proportion of Semitic roots, and stated that they are in majority of Arabic origin.

The French linguist Didier Morin (2001) has made an attempt to bridge the gap between Beja and another branch of Cushitic, namely Lowland East Cushitic languages and in particular Afar and Saho, the linguistic hypothesis being historically grounded on the fact that the three languages were once geographically contiguous. Most Beja speak the Beja language, but certain subgroups use other lingua franca. The Beni Amers speak a variety of Tigre, whereas most of the Halengas speak Arabic.

Although there is a marked Arabic influence, the Beja language is still widely spoken. The very fact that the highest moral and cultural values of this society are in one way or the other linked to their expression in Beja, that Beja poetry is still highly praised, and that the claims over the Beja land are only valid when expressed in Beja, are very strong social factors in favour of its preservation. True enough Arabic is considered as the language of modernity, but it is also very low in the scale of Beja cultural values as it is a means of transgressing social prohibitions. Beja is still the prestigious language for most of its speakers because it conforms to the ethical values of the community.

Subdivisions

The Bejas are divided into clans. These lineages include the Bisharin, Hedareb, Hadendowa (or Hadendoa), the Amarar (or Amar'ar), Beni-Amer, Hallenga, Habab, Belin and Hamran, some of whom are partly mixed with Bedouins in the east.

Beja society was traditionally organized into independent kingdoms. According to Al-Yaqubi, there were six such Beja polities that existed between Aswan and Massawa during the 9th century. Among these were the Kingdom of Bazin, Kingdom of Belgin, Kingdom of Jarin, Kingdom of Nagash, Kingdom of Qita'a and Kingdom of Tankish.

See also
Kingdom of Jarin
 Osman Digna
History of Sudan
Demographics of Sudan

References

Further reading

Ethnography

History 
A. Paul.  A history of the Beja tribes of the Sudan, Cambridge University Press, 2012.

External links

 Beja People
 The Beja Congress
 Fighting erupts in Eastern Sudan
 The National Movement for Eastern Sudan - NMES
 Meet the Beja

 
Ethnic groups in Egypt
Ethnic groups in Eritrea
Ethnic groups in Sudan
Ethnic groups in the Arab world
Cushitic-speaking peoples
Semitic-speaking peoples
Arabic-speaking people
Pastoralists
African nomads
Modern nomads
Indigenous peoples of North Africa
Indigenous peoples of East Africa
Blemmyes
Ethnic groups in the Middle East